Still Max is a Canadian documentary film, directed by Katherine Knight and released in 2021. The film is a portrait of Canadian multidisciplinary artist Max Dean, and his recent projects using art to confront his battle with prostate cancer.

The film premiered at the 2021 Hot Docs Canadian International Documentary Festival, where it was named one of five winners of the Rogers Audience Award.

References

External links

2021 films
2021 documentary films
Canadian documentary films
Documentary films about visual artists
Documentary films about cancer
2020s English-language films
2020s Canadian films